Chandra Bhushan Trivedi (2 February 1915  – 18 April 1982), better known by his pen name Ramai Kaka, was an Indian poet and writer who wrote in the Awadhi language.

References 

Hindi dramatists and playwrights
Hindi-language writers
1915 births
1982 deaths